It's Understood is the first studio album by the experimental rock band Estradasphere. It was released on Mimicry Records on June 26, 2000.

The first track on the album, "Hunger Strike", sets the tone of Estradasphere's repertoire by covering a wide range of musical genres including klezmer, jazz, bluegrass and heavy metal. At nineteen minutes and thirty seconds in length it is the longest song in the band's discography.

Tracks 6 through 9 are songs that form a four part composition titled "The Princes of Xibalba". Tracks 2 and 11 are not performed as such, but electronically sequenced by Tim Smolens and parody the music from popular video games such as Super Mario Bros. Track 12 was recorded at a violin recital for member Timb Harris. All other tracks were recorded at ROHYPONOL_Studios911 in 1999.

Track listing
 "Hunger Strike" (Jason Schimmel and Estradasphere) – 19:30
 "Cloud Land" (Tim Smolens) – 1:04
 "The Transformation" (Schimmel) – 8:25
 "Danse of Tosho and Slavi/Randy's Desert Adventure" (John Whooley and Schimmel) (Lyrics by David Murray) – 7:29
 "The Trials and Tribulations of Parking On Your Front Lawn" (Public Domain) – 4:14

The Princes of Xibalba – 11:28
 "The Princes" (Smolens) – 2:24
 "Los Dias Sin Dias" (Smolens) – 2:52
 "XQuiQ" (Smolens) – 2:43
 "Hunnahpu and Xbalanque" (Smolens) – 3:29

 "Spreading The Disease" (Murray, Smolens and G. Light) – 8:10
 "Planet Sparkle/Court Yard Battle 1" (Smolens) – 2:21
 "D♭ Hell" (Whooley and Schimmel) – 12:16

Album credits

The band
David Murray – drums, didgeridoo, flute, jaminator, vocals
Tim Smolens – bass, throat, vocals, keyboard
Jason Schimmel – guitars, banjo, piano, vocals
John Whooley – saxophones, vocals, percussion
Timb Harris – violin, trumpet, mandolin, vocals

Additional musicians
Aaron Seeman – accordion on tracks 1, 4, 5
MonoMan (TM) – positive feedback on track 12
Joel Robinow – lead vocals on track 3
Luke Kirley – trombone on track 3
George – mystery rap on track 3

Estradasphere circus
Atrocity & the Death Metal Cheerleaders
Gren Enyan – Yoga & Spiritual Advisor
David Poznanter – Balloons, Unicycle & Juggling
MonoMan (TM) – Disease Transmission
Soren – Gorilla Suit Guy
Kim – Chair Massage
Erin Wood – Pentagram & Sword
James Vergon – Fan That Wouldn't Go Away
Iris – Belly Dancing
George – Book
Isaac & Jessica – Fire Dancers

Other contributions

Audio
Produced and Engineered by Tim Smolens
Mixed by Tim Smolens and Trey Spruance
Mastered by George Horn, February 2000

Various
Art Direction – David Murray
Cover Design – Arena Reed
Design Assist – Margaret Murray
Cover Photo – Joey Ryken
Burning Man Stage – James Vergen
Group Photos – Greg Enyart & Janette Jancovicova
MonoMan (TM) – David Murray
Death Metal Cheerleaders – Naiya C.
Spreading the Disease – David Murray

References

2000 albums
Estradasphere albums
Web of Mimicry albums